Coleophora atriplicivora is a moth of the family Coleophoridae. It is found in the United States, including New Mexico.

The larvae feed on the seeds of Atriplex and Suaeda species. They create a trivalved, tubular silken case.

References

atriplicivora
Moths described in 1898
Moths of North America